Obrovac is a village located in the Bačka Palanka municipality, in the South Bačka District of Serbia. It is situated in the Autonomous Province of Vojvodina. The village has a Serb ethnic majority and its population numbering 3,177 people (2002 census).

Name 

Name Obrovac is of Serbian origin (there is a town in Croatian Dalmatia with same name, see: Obrovac, Croatia). Germans and Hungarians also used modified versions of this Serbian name: Obrowatz (in German) or Boróc, previously Obrovácz (in Hungarian).

History 

Serbs established it in 1308. It was destroyed by Ottomans in 1526, after The Battle of Mohács. Growth of the village starts at the end of the 16th century. During the Ottoman rule (16th-17th century), Obrovac was mostly populated by ethnic Serbs.

In 1698, people who left Metković (now Nova Gajdobra) settled in Obrovac. In 1757, Orthodox church and school were built. In 1786, 138 Serb families lived in the village. At the same time, many German people came here from Bavaria (after 1768). In 1825, Catholic church and school for German children were built. In 1904, 1,985 Germans and 1,072 Serbs lived in Obrovac. Today, village has many cultural and sports manifestations.

Historical population 

 1880: 2,730
 1910: 2,930
 1921: 3,039
 1961: 3,512
 1971: 3,174
 1981: 3,245
 1991: 3,242
 2002: 3,177

References
Slobodan Ćurčić, Broj stanovnika Vojvodine, Novi Sad, 1996.

Gallery

See also 
Bačka Palanka
South Bačka District
Bačka
List of cities, towns and villages in Vojvodina

Bačka Palanka
Places in Bačka
South Bačka District